Hesar-e Shalpush (also Romanized as Ḩeşār-e Shālpūsh; also known as Ḩeşār and Qal‘eh-ye Bālā) is a village in Malard Rural District, in the Central District of Malard County, Tehran Province, Iran. At the 2006 census, its population was 324, in 80 families.

References 

Populated places in Malard County